Via Balbi is a street in the historical centre of Genoa, in Northwestern Italy, named after the aristocratic Genoese Balbi family. It is one of the Strade Nuove (Italian for "new streets") built by the Genoese aristocracy during the Renaissance. Since July 2006 it is inscribed in the list of UNESCO World Heritage Site Genoa: the Strade Nuove and the system of the Palazzi dei Rolli.

History 
Formerly known as Strada Balbi, the street was built between 1602 and 1620 as a cooperation between the city authorities and the Balbi family to improve the connection between the city center and the area around the harbor.

Between the first half of the 16th century and the first half of the 17th century, the nobility of the Republic of Genoa started a careful town planning to transform the existing medieval city and initiate a sizeable urban expansion to the North. The move to expand the antique palaces and to build new sumptuous ones was driven by the extraordinary wealth that came into the city through prosperous financing activities towards several European powers. In particular, the Genoese aristocracy financed the expensive undertakings of the Spanish Crown, such as the mercenary army that Spain kept in Flanders from 1566 to the peace of Westphalia in 1648. The ruling class of Genoa, mixing nobility of blood with new mercantile wealth, sought to underpin their prestige by the construction of grand city palaces and suburban villas of unusual splendor.

The first stretch of the street includes seven palaces, all formerly owned by the Balbi family, the former Collegium of the Jesuits (now the main seat of the University of Genoa) with the church of San Girolamo e Francesco Saverio and the Carmelite church of San Vittore e Carlo. The final stretch, which used to count eight 17th century monasteries, was modified in the 19th century, when the nearby train station of Genova Principe was built.

Palaces listed as a UNESCO World Heritage Site

Quotes 
 Stendhal, describes via Balbi and Le Strade Nuove as the most beautiful in Italy

 Charles Dickens gave a suggestive description of Strada Balbi in his travelogue Pictures from Italy.

Gallery

See also 
 Genoa: The Strade Nuove and the system of the Palazzi dei Rolli
 Via Giuseppe Garibaldi (Genoa)
 Via Cairoli (Genoa)
 Republic of Genoa
 Genoa

References

Bibliography 
 Giorgio Doria (1995), Nobiltà e investimenti a Genova in Età moderna, Genova
 Gioconda Pomella (2007), Guida Completa ai Palazzi dei Rolli Genova, Genova, De Ferrari Editore()
 Mauro Quercioli (2008), I Palazzi dei Rolli di Genova, Roma, Libreria dello Stato
 Fiorella Caraceni Poleggi (2001), Palazzi Antichi e Moderni di Genova raccolti e disegnati da Pietro Paolo Rubens (1652), Genova, Tormena Editore
 Mario Labò (2003), I palazzi di Genova di P.P. Rubens, Genova, Nuova Editrice Genovese

External links 

  

Buildings and structures in Genoa
Tourist attractions in Genoa